Evans' Regiment of Militia also known as the 4th New Hampshire Militia Regiment was called up at Exeter, New Hampshire on September 8, 1777 as reinforcements for the Continental Army during the Saratoga Campaign. The regiment marched quickly to join the gathering forces of General Horatio Gates as he faced British General John Burgoyne in northern New York. The regiment served in General Ebenezer Learned's brigade of the Continental Army. With the surrender of Burgoyne's Army on October 17 the regiment was disbanded on December 15, 1777. The Regiment was called up again as part of Gen. John Sullivan's army at the unsuccessful Battle of Rhode Island in 1778.

Sources

Provincial and State Papers of New Hampshire

External links
Bibliography of the Continental Army in New Hampshire compiled by the United States Army Center of Military History

Evans' Regiment of Militia
Military units and formations established in 1777
Military units and formations disestablished in 1778
1777 establishments in New Hampshire
1778 disestablishments in the United States